Flik 14, later Flik 14J was an aviation company of the Austro-Hungarian Airforce during the First World War. The company used Phönix D.II aircraft.

History 
It was organized in 1914, the captain of the company was Jenő Kara. At the beginning it worked on the front lines in Russia, later it was sent to the Italian front. The second leader of the company was Lieutenant Károly Benedek Károly. The company had one known ace pilot, Karl Teichmann who officially had one of his victories while with Flik 14.

At the end of the war neither Austria, nor Hungary, was allowed to maintain an air force, so Flik 14 was disbanded.

Ace pilots 

Austro-Hungarian Air Force